Opuntia tortispina is a species of flowering plant in the family Cactaceae, native to the central United States (Colorado, Kansas, Nebraska, New Mexico, Oklahoma, Texas and Wyoming). It was first described in 1856.

References

tortispina

Plants described in 1856